Polygonum serotinum, commonly called southern jointweed or American jointweed, is a species of flowering plant in the knotweed family. It is native to Southeastern United States extending in scattered locations west to New Mexico. Its preferred habitat is dry, sandy areas.

Polygonum serotinum was first described in 1820 by Constantine Samuel Rafinesque. It was at one time placed in the genus Polygonella (under the name Polygonella ), but in 2015, following a series of molecular phylogenetic studies, this genus was subsumed into Polygonum.

References

serotinum
Flora of the Southeastern United States
Flora of New Mexico
Plants described in 1820
Taxa named by Constantine Samuel Rafinesque
Flora without expected TNC conservation status